Minimaphaenops lipsae is a species of beetle in the family Carabidae, the only species in the genus Minimaphaenops.

References

Trechinae